Cotton Hill is a fictional character on the television series King of the Hill.

Cotton Hill may also refer to:

Cotton Hill (Limestone County, Alabama), a historic mansion and plantation
Cotton Hill, West Virginia
Cotton Hill Township, Sangamon County, Illinois